Scombroidei is a suborder of the Perciformes, the largest order of fish. The suborder includes the barracuda, tuna, and mackerel, as well as the billfish. Regular Scombrids are observed to have large heads, eyes, and mouths. In most cases, the second dorsal fin will develop before the development of the first.

References
 

 
Ray-finned fish suborders